Aseminun District is a district (bakhsh) in Manujan County, Kerman Province, Iran. At the 2006 census, its population was 24,561, in 5,342 families.  The district has one city: Nowdezh. The district has three rural districts (dehestan): Bajgan Rural District, Deh Kahan Rural District, and Nowdezh Rural District.

References 

Manujan County

Districts of Kerman Province